Amisan may refer to:
Amisan (Gangwon), mountain in South Korea
Amisan (South Chungcheong), mountain in South Korea